Shosse Entuziastov is a station on the Moscow Central Circle of the Moscow Metro that opened in September 2016.

Name
The station was named for the road on which it is situated.

Transfer
Passengers may make out-of-station transfers to Shosse Entuziastov station on the Kalininsko-Solntsevskaya Line.

Gallery

References

External links 
 mkzd.ru

Moscow Metro stations
Railway stations in Russia opened in 2016
Moscow Central Circle stations